The Cedar Rapids Police Department is the municipal police department for the city of Cedar Rapids, Iowa.

History 
Early historical records from the 1840s indicate that a lone constable served the Cedar Rapids population. By 1883, the Cedar Rapids Police Department had grown to 12 Police Officers. In 1948, the department completed an FM police radio installation which allowed all emergency services to communicate with each other.

Substation
The department has a substation located at 1233 1st Avenue SE, Cedar Rapids, Iowa. The substation is also known as the Community Connections Resource Center and was opened in 2009. The substation serves as a space for police officers to complete reports and other duties, and is also used by employees of the Willis Dady Emergency Homeless shelter and for various community meetings and events.

November 2016 shooting by an officer 
A traffic stop in which a Cedar Rapids Police Officer shot a man on November 1 gathered national attention. A white police officer, Officer Lucas Jones, shot and paralyzed an unarmed motorist, Jerime Mitchell, from the neck down. Upon a search of Mitchell's vehicle, 1 pound of marijuana, $1,500 in cash, and scales were located. Police also reviewed Mitchell's cell phone records and discovered text messages in which he planned to sell the marijuana to a customer. Officer Jones has been cleared of any criminal charges by a grand jury.

Officers killed 
In the history of the Cedar Rapids Police Department, six officers have been killed while on duty.

References 

Cedar Rapids, Iowa
Municipal police departments of Iowa